The Banque Franco-Serbe (BFS, "French-Serbian Bank") was a French bank founded in 1910 to support French projects in the Kingdom of Serbia. It was a major financial institution in Serbia, then the Kingdom of Serbs, Croats and Slovenes and Kingdom of Yugoslavia until World War II.

History

The Paris-based Société Générale and Bardac family bank also participated. The BFS's Parisian head office was initially established in a building that had been acquired by the BUP in 1905 at 14, rue Le Peletier, and moved in the early 1920s to a new building at 100, rue de la Victoire. The BFS had a branch in Belgrade from the start. It also soon opened an office in London.

In 1914, following the Balkan Wars, the BFS took over the former BIO branches in Bitola and Skopje. During World War I, its activity in Serbia was suspended and its local gold reserves were shipped by the French Navy to Marseille via Thessaloniki. By 1925, it had additional branches in Fiume, Thessaloniki, and Zagreb, and by 1930 also in Niš. Following financial difficulties, the BIO, by then controlled by the Banque de Paris et des Pays-Bas (BPPB), became the BFS's majority owner through a capital restructuring in 1928. 

The operations of the BFS in Yugoslavia were nationalized by the Communist authorities by December 1946, together with all other banks in the country, and merged into the National Bank of Yugoslavia. The French entity kept existing until at least the 1970s as a subsidiary of the BPPB.

Leadership
 , Chairman 1910-1928
 Raoul Mallet, Chairman 1928-1937
 Frédéric Pillet-Will (son of the ), Chairman 1937-1948 (?)
 Philippe Mallet, Chairman and Chief Executive 1948-1973

Gallery

See also
 National Bank of Serbia
 Banque de Salonique
 Bank of Romania

Notes

Defunct banks of France
Banks established in 1910
Banks of Serbia